Klaus Jerominek (20 May 1931 – 20 November 2018) was a Polish footballer. He played in one match for the Poland national football team in 1952.

References

External links
 

1931 births
2018 deaths
Polish footballers
Poland international footballers
Place of birth missing
Association footballers not categorized by position